North Pine is a settlement in British Columbia.

Settlements in British Columbia